The Berlin Military Tattoo, or simply just the Berlin Tattoo is a German music show that features and showcases the Military bands of the Bundeswehr and foreign countries. The tattoo takes place on the first weekend of November in Berlin and is based on the concept of the Royal Edinburgh Military Tattoo. The event is currently the biggest tattoo in the Federal Republic of Germany. The tattoo is led by many producers, a notable one being Major Michael Parker of the British Army, who also was responsible for producing the Royal Tournament.

Until 2010, the tattoo was known as the Berlin Military Music Festival and took place in the Max-Schmeling-Halle. From 2011–2013, it took place in the O2 World Berlin (now the Mercedes-Benz Arena). In June 2014, the Berlin Tattoo was held in the Waldbühne.

Sources and Links

Official Website
Der Königgrätzer Marsch - Berlin Tattoo
The Tattoo in 2011

German military music
Events in Berlin
Annual events in Germany
Festivals in Berlin
Music festivals in Germany
Military tattoos